Eric Lamonte Smith (born September 15, 1971) is a former American football wide receiver and return specialist who played in the National Football League for one season. He played college football at Northwest Mississippi Community College and LSU.

College career
Smith played two seasons at Northwest Mississippi Community College in Senatobia, Mississippi, after which he transferred to Louisiana State University. Smith sat out the 1993 season and played the next two seasons for the Tigers.

Professional career

Scottish Claymores
Smith played with the Scottish Claymores of the World League of American Football (WLAF) in the spring of 1997. He caught 19 passes for 202 yards. Smith also returned seven punts for 94 yards and 21 kickoffs for 552 yards and one touchdown.

Chicago Bears
Smith signed with the Chicago Bears for the 1997 NFL season. He played in seven games for the Bears, primarily on special teams. Smith returned ten kicks for 196 yards, with the longest being for 28 yards. He also caught two passes for 22 yards.

References

External links
 Pro Football Archives bio

1971 births
Living people
American expatriate sportspeople in Scotland
Players of American football from Florida
American football wide receivers
American football return specialists
Northwest Mississippi Rangers football players
Vero Beach High School alumni
LSU Tigers football players
Scottish Claymores players
Chicago Bears players
People from Vero Beach, Florida